The Cureton-Huff House is located in Greenville County near Simpsonville, South Carolina on what is now known as West Georgia Road, or County Road 541. The two-story braced-frame farmhouse on a brick pier foundation was built ca 1820 for John Moon Cureton, a wealthy farmer. It was originally built in the common hall-and-parlor configuration but shortly after its initial construction, the house was altered to a central-hall configuration. Despite more modern additions to the rear of the house including a kitchen, bathrooms, dining room and office, the majority of the house has retained its original, historic Federal-period detailing.

The property the house sits on includes several barns and animal pens, corn cribs, a garage, a blacksmith shop and a carriage house. A family cemetery, surrounded by a low stone wall, is also located on the property. The house and property is still owned by descendants of John Moon Cureton.

References

National Register of Historic Places in Greenville County, South Carolina
Houses completed in 1820
Houses in Greenville County, South Carolina
Simpsonville, South Carolina